José Isidro Chacón Díaz (born  January 27, 1977 in Táriba) is a Venezuelan professional racing cyclist.

Major results

2000
 1st Stage 2 Vuelta al Táchira
 4th Overall Vuelta a Venezuela
2001
 1st Overall Vuelta a Venezuela
1st Stages 9 & 10a
 1st Stage 7 Vuelta al Táchira
2002
 1st Overall Vuelta a Bramon
1st Stage 2
 Vuelta al Táchira
1st Stages 3 & 12
 1st Stage 5 Vuelta a Venezuela
2003
 1st  National Time Trial Championships
 1st Overall Vuelta a Venezuela
1st Stages 5a & 10
2004
 1st Pan American Time Trial Championships
 1st  National Road Race Championships
 1st  National Time Trial Championships
 1st Stage 9 Vuelta al Táchira
 1st Stage 4 Vuelta a Venezuela
 2nd Overall Vuelta a Cuba
2005
 1st Overall Vuelta a Venezuela
 2nd Overall Vuelta al Tachira
1st Stage 8
 2nd Overall Vuelta al Estado Portugesa
1st Stage 3
 2nd Overall Vuelta a Yacambu-Lara
2006
 1st Stage 1 Clasico Aniversario Federacion Ciclista de Venezuela
 2nd Central American and Caribbean Games – Individual time trial
 3rd Overall Vuelta a Venezuela
2007
 1st Stage 2 Vuelta al Táchira
 1st Stage 9 Vuelta a Venezuela
2008
 1st Stage 12 Vuelta al Táchira
 5th Overall Vuelta a Venezuela
2009
 3rd Overall Vuelta a Venezuela
2013
 2nd Overall Tour de Guadeloupe
1st Stage 8b (ITT)
 4th Overall Vuelta a Venezuela
2016
 3rd Overall Tour de Guadeloupe

External links

1977 births
Living people
Venezuelan male cyclists
Olympic cyclists of Venezuela
Cyclists at the 2004 Summer Olympics
Vuelta a Venezuela stage winners
People from Táchira
Central American and Caribbean Games gold medalists for Venezuela
Central American and Caribbean Games silver medalists for Venezuela
Central American and Caribbean Games bronze medalists for Venezuela
Competitors at the 2002 Central American and Caribbean Games
Competitors at the 2006 Central American and Caribbean Games
Central American and Caribbean Games medalists in cycling
Competitors at the 2010 Central American and Caribbean Games
21st-century Venezuelan people